Swedish Armed Forces Medal for Wounded in Battle (FMGMsis) is a Swedish is a reward medal instituted by the Swedish Armed Forces and is awarded to Swedish Armed Forces personnel wounded directly or indirectly as a result of battle during international mission.

History
The medal was instituted by the government decision 20 FÖ2010/1074/MFI on 25 March 2011 and was developed by the Swedish Armed Forces in collaboration with the Kungl. Maj:ts orden and the National Swedish Museums of Military History with its Board of Military Traditions (Försvarets traditionsnämnd).

Appearance
The medal is available in gold and silver and is worn in with ribbon where the red symbolizes the blood and the black mourning. The silver medal is awarded to Swedish Armed Forces personnel wounded in action. The gold medal can be posthumously awarded to those who had been killed in action. On the medal is a laurel wreath and the text "With life at stake" (Med livet som insats) and "For Sweden" (För Sverige) and the name of the person who receives it.

Presenting

The medal may be awarded to a person outside of the Swedish Armed Forces organization. For someone to be awarded the medal, the person in question needs to belong to the Swedish Armed Forces (eg, having a position in the unit that is conducting the operation) or be under the command of someone belonging to the Swedish Armed Forces. With the latter, for example, means a person who represents an authority or a civil organization and that at the time of the injury participated, collaborated with, supported or was protected by the Swedish Armed Forces' operations.

Recipients

In silver

Veterans Day 29 May 2011 
 Robin Hedlund, wounded in action whilst serving in Afghanistan (FS 17)
 David Ström, wounded in action whilst serving in Afghanistan (FS 17)
 Mikael Thorén, wounded in action whilst serving in Afghanistan (FS 17)

Veterans Day 29 May 2012 
 Furir Göte Enquist because of the action in Gaza on 4 January 1957
 Överfurir Torsten Stålnacke because of the action in the Congo on 14 September 1961
 Fanjunkare Björn Bäck because of the action in the Congo on 21 September 1961
 Furir Per Martinsson because of the action in the Congo on 5 October 1961
 Corporal Roland Knutsson because of the action in the Congo on 17 December 1961
 Ulf Isaksson because of the action in the Congo on 18 December 1961
 Major Stig von Bayer because of the action in the Congo on 10 December 1961
 Sergeant Matz Lindberg because of the action in Lebanon on 29 March 1978
 Furir Magnus Rockler because of the action in Lebanon on 23 December 1986
 Private Björn Eggeblad because of the action in Lebanon on 13 September 1991
 Private Tommy Andersson because of the action in Lebanon on 13 September 1991
 Sergeant First Class Christoffer Lundström because of the action in Lebanon on 27 January 1994
 Private Stefan Sundelin because of the action in Afghanistan on 17 September 2010
 Private Lennie Johansson because of the action in Afghanistan on 18 October 2010
 Patrick Svensson because of the action in Afghanistan on 18 October 2010
 Furir Kongo Magnéli because of the action in Afghanistan on 20 October 2010
 Major Bengt Flodin because of the action in Afghanistan on 19 November 2010
 Milad Samadi because of the action in Afghanistan on 13 June 2011

Sweden's National Day 6 June 2012
 Major Christer Carmnes, Luleå, because of the action in Lebanon on 26 June 1986
 Private Lennart Hultkrantz, Falköping, because of actions in Lebanon
 Magnus Heed, Stockholm, because of the action in Bosnia on 3 November 1993
 Furir Peter Enström, Visby, because of the action in Bosnia on 3 November 1993
 Private Bo Nilsson, Havdhem, because of actions in Bosnia in 1993/1994
 Benny Anderbro, Stockholm, because of actions in Bosnia in 1993/1994
 Carl Ronander, Täby, because of the action in Bosnia on 26 January 1994
 Peter Nilsson, Malmö, because of the action in Bosnia on 22 February 1994
 Thomas Ståhlhammar, Veberöd, because of the action in Bosnia on 22 February 1994
 Björn Persson, Bjärnum, because of the action in Bosnia on 22 February 1994
 Göran Byström, Borlänge, because of the action in Bosnia on 22 February 1994
 Private Stig-Inge Blennow, Lomma, because of the action in Bosnia on 22 February 1994
 Fänrik Kristoffer Melinder, Saltsjö-Duvnäs, because of the action in Bosnia on 28 April 1994
 Private Mathias Hackzell, Stockholm, because of the action in Bosnia on 14 January 1996
 Sergeant Karl-Magnus Karlsson, Växjö, because of the action in Bosnia on 14 January 1996
 Private John Lantz, Visby, because of the action in Bosnia on 14 January 1996
 Furir Martin Steen Enders, Vallentuna, because of the action in Bosnia on 14 January 1996
 Private Anders Gahnström, Boden, because of the action in Bosnia on 14 January 1996
 Furir Björn Wadelius, Tierp, because of actions in Bosnia in 1995
 Christopher Hagwall, Åsa, because of actions in Bosnia in 1995
 Lars Lindén, Norrköping, because of actions in former Yugoslavia in 1995
 Sergeant Anders Halldén, Eskilstuna, because of actions in Bosnia in 1996
 Private Peter Kero, Tärendö, because of the action in Afghanistan on 11 November 2009
 Ahmad Saadoun, Uppsala, because of the action in Afghanistan on 6 July 2011
 Emil Sehlberg, Luleå, because of the action in Afghanistan on 13 August 2011

Veterans Day 29 May 2013
 Bo Lennart Andersson, Kista, because of the action in the Congo on 17 December 1960.
 Sonny Ek, Älvsjö, because of the action in the Congo on 13 September 1961
 Hans Mååg, Falun, because of the action in the Congo on 9 December 1961
 Arne Ehn, Blomstermåla, because of the action in the Congo on 10 December 1961
 Erik Härtel, Jönköping, because of the action in the Congo on 16 December 1961.
 Leif Ove Larsson, Slöinge, because of the action in the Congo on 16 December 1961
 Bengt Jansson, Sollentuna, because of the action in Lebanon during 1981
 Dennis Gouranius, Norrköping, because of the action in Lebanon on 9 January 2005
 Peter Hallgren, Skärplinge, because of the action in Bosnia during 1994
 Michael Calmhede, Stockholm, because of the action in Bosnia in May 1995
 Niklas Tornesjö, Norrköping, because of the action in Afghanistan on 16 June 2007
 Martin Toftevall, Eslöv, because of the action in Afghanistan on 3 August 2008
 Heikki Harinen, Kyrkslätt, Finland, because of the action in Afghanistan on 19 November 2010
 Efosa Erharuyi, Esbo, Finland, because of the action in Afghanistan on 19 November 2010
 Roger Ivholm, Vassmolösa, because of the action in Afghanistan on 23 March 2012

Veterans Day 29 May 2014
Ove Eriksson, wounded in the Congo on 16 December 1961 
Joakim Bohm, wounded in Bosnia in 1993

Veterans Day 29 May 2015

Sven Monander, Karlstad, wounded in action in the Congo in 1961
Eiron Johansson, Jönköping, wounded in action in Suez in 1973
Gunnar Hällgren, Lidingö, wounded in action in Bosnia in 1994
Ulf Kassfeldt, Sundborn, wounded in action in Bosnia in 1996
Morgan Andersson, Göteborg, wounded in action in Afghanistan in 2011

Veterans Day 29 May 2016
Olof Wärnick, Gunnarn, wounded in action in Gaza in 1967
Lenn Moberg, Torslanda, wounded in action in Macedonia in 1993
Per Sjöberg, Kulltorp, wounded in action in Kosovo in 2004
Andreas Stenberg, Kristianstad, wounded in action in Afghanistan in 2011

Veterans Day 29 May 2017
Alexander Sjödin, Vilhelmina, wounded in action in Afghanistan in 2010
Inge Haraldsson, Dals Långed, wounded in action in Cyprus in 1967

Veterans Day 29 May 2018
Vice corporal Jonas Schmidt, Malmö, wounded in action in Mali in 2017

In gold
None

References

Orders, decorations, and medals of Sweden
Awards established in 2011
Wound decorations
2011 establishments in Sweden